Lutfor Rahman (born 1 January 1962) is a pioneer of beating heart bypass surgery in Bangladesh. He currently works at Labaid Cardiac Hospital, Dhaka, Bangladesh as Chief Cardiac Surgeon.

Early life and education
Lutfor Rahman was born on 1 January 1962 in Pabna, Bangladesh. He completed his MBBS from Dhaka Medical College and Hospital in 1988. Later on, in 1997, he completed a Master of Surgery (MS) from National Institute of Cardiovascular Diseases (NICVD).

Personal life
In 1991, Rahman  married Rana Ferdous Ratna BSS(honours),MSS(DU), a sociologist.  Their daughter Farisha Khan is a law graduate from SOAS, University of London, working at Latham & Watkin lpc , top American law firm in London.son Faryal Khan was student of Sunbeams, did IB at Sevenoaks school, Kent, England, now studying undergraduate in Natural science at University of Cambridge , UK.

Career 
Rahman worked in government hospitals  for 10 years. Later on, he joined Sikder Medical, Dhaka, Bangladesh in 1999 as a cardiac surgeon. In 2002, he became Head of Cardiac Surgery in Sikder Medical. After three years, he moved to Labaid Cardiac Hospital, Dhaka as Chief Cardiac Surgeon.

Honorary Awards (2006)

Election 
In 1990, after the fall of Ershad, he contested in the national parliament election for an MP position from his own constituency at Pabna.

References

External links
 
 
 
 
 

1962 births
Living people
People from Pabna District
Bangladeshi cardiac surgeons
Dhaka Medical College alumni